Ride Forth is the fourth studio album by American thrash metal band Exmortus. It was released on January 8, 2016 on Prosthetic Records.

Track listing

References

External links
 Metal Injection
 Exmortus Official

2016 albums
Exmortus albums
Prosthetic Records albums